Cazzie Lee Russell (born June 7, 1944) is an American former professional basketball player and coach. An NBA All-Star, he was selected by the New York Knicks with the first overall pick of the 1966 NBA draft. He won an NBA championship with the Knicks in 1970.

College career

In 1962, while playing at Chicago's Carver High School, Russell was named the Chicago Sun-Times Boy's Player of the Year. Russell played college basketball at the University of Michigan.

Along with Bill Buntin, Russell led the Wolverines to three consecutive Big Ten Conference titles (1964–66) and to Final Four appearances in 1964 and 1965, losing in the final game 91-80 to defending national champion UCLA and John Wooden in 1965.

In 1966, Russell averaged 30.8 points per game and was named the College Basketball Player of the Year. Crisler Arena, which opened in 1967, has been dubbed The House that Cazzie Built. Russell was also initiated into Kappa Alpha Psi fraternity - Sigma Chapter in 1964.

Professional career
Russell was drafted by the New York Knicks with the first overall pick of the 1966 NBA draft, playing for them for five seasons (1966–1971). While playing for the Knicks he was named to the 1967 All-Rookie Team and won the NBA Finals in 1970.

In 1971, he was traded to the Golden State Warriors in exchange for Jerry Lucas and appeared in the 1972 NBA All-Star Game. In 1974, Russell signed with the Los Angeles Lakers when the Warriors did not offer him a no-cut contract. While with the Lakers he became the last player to wear the number 32 and 33 jerseys before Magic Johnson and Kareem Abdul-Jabbar. In 1978, he signed with the Chicago Bulls, which would conclude his NBA career.

In total, Russell spent 12 seasons in the NBA (1966–1978).

During the 1978–79 season, Russell played for the Great Falls Sky of the Western Basketball Association (WBA). He ended his career after the 1980–81 season when he played for the Philadelphia Kings of the Continental Basketball Association.

Coaching career
In 1981, he became the head coach for the Lancaster Lightning of the CBA. He guided the team to the 1981–82 league championship. During the playoffs, with his team depleted by injuries, Russell came out of retirement and played for the Lightning in the final game of the league championship series, played in Lancaster, Pennsylvania. Russell was named the CBA Coach of the Year in 1982. Russell later coached the Wyoming Wildcatters, Grand Rapids Hoops and Columbus Horizon of the CBA and the Mid-Michigan Great Lakers in the Global Basketball Association. He also served as assistant coach of the Atlanta Hawks for two seasons (1988–1990).

Russell was the head coach of the men's basketball team at the Savannah College of Art and Design for 13 seasons, until the college eliminated the sport in 2009. He still remains at the college in an administrative capacity.

He served as an assistant coach at Armstrong State University until 2017 when it was discontinued.

He spent several years as head coach at Centennial High School in Columbus, Ohio, during the mid-1990s before taking the job in Georgia. He is now the assistant coach of the Flagler College Saints women's basketball team.

Military service
During the 1960s, while with the Knicks, Russell was in the Fighting 69th Regiment of the New York Army National Guard. He started in the army as a private. He participated in army service during the basketball season, including being recalled to active duty during national emergencies.

Honors
In 2006, Russell was voted as one of the 100 Legends of the IHSA Boys Basketball Tournament, a group of former players and coaches in honor of the 100 anniversary of the IHSA boys basketball tournament.

Russell received the Bobby Jones Award in 2015 at the Athletes in Action All Star Breakfast, which is held each year at the NBA All Star Weekend.

In 2016 Russell was the recipient of the Coach Wooden "Keys to Life" Award at the Athletes in Action Legends of the Hardwood Breakfast, which is held each year at the Final Four.

NBA career statistics

Regular season

|-
| style="text-align:left;"|
| style="text-align:left;"|New York
| 77 || – || 22.0 || .436 || – || .785 || 3.3 || 2.4 || – || – || 11.3
|-
| style="text-align:left;"|
| style="text-align:left;"|New York
| 82 || – || 28.0 || .462 || – || .808 || 4.6 || 2.4 || – || – || 16.9
|-
| style="text-align:left;"|
| style="text-align:left;"|New York
| 50 || – || 32.9 || .450 || – || .796 || 4.2 || 2.3 || – || – || 18.3
|-
| style="text-align:left; background:#afe6ba;"|†
| style="text-align:left;"|New York
| 78 || – || 20.0 || .498 || – || .775 || 3.0 || 1.7 || – || – || 11.5
|-
| style="text-align:left;"|
| style="text-align:left;"|New York
| 57 || – || 18.5 || .429 || – || .773 || 3.4 || 1.4 || – || – || 9.2
|-
| style="text-align:left;"|
| style="text-align:left;"|Golden State
| 79 || – || 36.7 || .455 || – || .833 || 5.4 || 3.1 || – || – || 21.4
|-
| style="text-align:left;"|
| style="text-align:left;"|Golden State
| 80 || – || 30.4 || .458 || – || .864 || 4.4 || 2.3 || – || – || 15.7
|-
| style="text-align:left;"|
| style="text-align:left;"|Golden State
| 82 || – || 31.4 || .482 || – || .835 || 4.3 || 2.3 || .7 || .2 || 20.5
|-
| style="text-align:left;"|
| style="text-align:left;"|L.A. Lakers
| 40 || – || 26.4 || .455 || – || .894 || 2.9 || 2.7 || .7 || .1 || 15.7
|-
| style="text-align:left;"|
| style="text-align:left;"|L.A. Lakers
| 74 || – || 22.0 || .463 || – || .892 || 2.5 || 1.6 || .7 || .0 || 11.8
|-
| style="text-align:left;"|
| style="text-align:left;"|L.A. Lakers
| 82 || – || 31.5 || .490 || – || .858 || 3.6 || 2.6 || 1.0 || .1 || 16.4
|-
| style="text-align:left;"|
| style="text-align:left;"|Chicago
| 36 || – || 21.9 || .438 || – || .860 || 2.3 || 1.7 || .5 || .1 || 8.8
|- class="sortbottom"
| style="text-align:center;" colspan="2"|Career
| 817 || – || 27.2 || .464 || – || .827 || 3.8 || 2.4 || .8 || .1 || 15.1
|- class="sortbottom"
| style="text-align:center;" colspan="2"|All-Star
| 1 || 0 || 20.0 || .308 || – || 1.000 || 1.0 || .0 || – || – || 10.0

Playoffs

|-
| style="text-align:left;"|1967
| style="text-align:left;”|New York
| 4 || – || 22.3 || .394 || – || .769 || 4.8 || 2.8 || – || – || 15.5
|-
| style="text-align:left;"|1968
| style="text-align:left;”|New York
| 6 || – || 34.8 || .561 || – || .833 || 3.8 || 1.7 || – || – || 21.7
|-
| style="text-align:left;"|1969
| style="text-align:left;”|New York
| 5 || – || 7.2 || .238 || – || 1.000 || 1.0 || .2 || – || – || 2.4
|-
| style="text-align:left;background:#afe6ba;"|1970†
| style="text-align:left;”|New York
| 19 || – || 16.1 || .485 || – || .947 || 2.5 || .8 || – || – || 9.4
|-
| style="text-align:left;"|1971
| style="text-align:left;”|New York
| 11 || – || 10.9 || .391 || – || 1.000 || 2.0 || .7 || – || – || 5.6
|-
| style="text-align:left;"|1972
| style="text-align:left;”|Golden State
| 5 || – || 32.2 || .492 || – || .750 || 4.4 || 1.8 || – || – || 14.2
|-
| style="text-align:left;"|1973
| style="text-align:left;”|Golden State
| 11 || – || 23.9 || .490 || – || .864 || 3.3 || 1.5  || – || – || 14.8
|-
| style="text-align:left;"|1977
| style="text-align:left;”|L.A. Lakers
| 11 || – || 34.7 || .414 || – || .880 || 4.4 || 2.3 || 1.5 || .1 || 15.8
|- class="sortbottom"
| style="text-align:center;" colspan="2"|Career
| 72 || – || 21.8 || .460 || – || .870 || 3.1 || 1.3 || 1.5 || .1 || 11.8

See also
 University of Michigan Athletic Hall of Honor

References

1944 births
Living people
African-American basketball coaches
African-American basketball players
All-American college men's basketball players
Amateur Athletic Union men's basketball players
American men's basketball coaches
American men's basketball players
American military sports players
Basketball coaches from Illinois
Chicago Bulls players
Continental Basketball Association coaches
Golden State Warriors players
Los Angeles Lakers players
Michigan Wolverines men's basketball players
National Basketball Association All-Stars
National Basketball Association broadcasters
National Collegiate Basketball Hall of Fame inductees
New York Knicks draft picks
New York Knicks players
New York National Guard personnel
Parade High School All-Americans (boys' basketball)
Philadelphia Kings players
Shooting guards
Small forwards
United States Army soldiers
Western Basketball Association players
Basketball players from Chicago
21st-century African-American people
20th-century African-American sportspeople